Jaroslav Foldyna (born 26 June 1960) is a Czech politician and an MP in the Chamber of Deputies.

Foldyna was a member of the ČSSD and was elected as an MP for the party in 2013. He served as vice-chairman of the ČSSD from 2018 to 2019 before resigning from the party. In 2020, he became a member of the Freedom and Direct Democracy (SPD) party and was returned as an MP for the SPD.

Foldyna has been an opponent of the Turkish governments actions against the Kurds and has called for Turkey to be expelled from NATO. He has also stated that interventions by European countries and the United States in Libya contributed to an influx of illegal immigration into Europe. Foldyna has also expressed opposition to Kosovan independence. He has also been criticized for alleged links to the Russian nationalist Night Wolves motorcycle club.

He is of maternal Serbian descent.

References

External link

1960 births
Living people
People from Česká Lípa
Czech politicians
Government ministers of the Czech Republic
Czech Social Democratic Party MPs
Freedom and Direct Democracy MPs
Members of the Chamber of Deputies of the Czech Republic (2013–2017)
Members of the Chamber of Deputies of the Czech Republic (2017–2021)
Members of the Chamber of Deputies of the Czech Republic (2021–2025)
Czech people of Serbian descent